The Turkish military operation in Idlib Governorate, code-named Idlib De-escalation Control Force activities by Turkey, is an operation by the Turkish Armed Forces which started in October 2017, following the earlier Operation Euphrates Shield. It is the third cross-border operation by the Turkish military, following Operation Euphrates Shield and Operation Shah Euphrates.

Background 
The operation was launched following the 2017 Astana agreement and subsequent Sochi agreement between Turkey, Russia and Iran. Among other things, the two agreements contained provisions for the Turkish Armed Forces to set up and maintain 12 observation posts within rebel-held territories in the Idlib Governorate.

Timeline

2017
The Turkish Armed Forces set up their first observation outposts in Idlib in October 2017. Following their deployment, there were reports of minor clashes with Hayat Tahrir al-Sham militants.

2018

In February, the Turkish military observation outposts were expanded into northern and southeastern Idlib Governorate. On 6 February, a Turkish observation was attacked by rockets and mortars, killing a Turkish soldier and wounding five others.

On 22 May, the Turkish army established its twelfth and last military observation post in Idlib province.

Idlib demilitarization 

On 15 September 2018, the Turkish observation posts were made an official part of the 2018 Idlib demilitarization agreement.

2019

Northwestern Syria offensive (April–August 2019) 

Following the start of the 2019 Northwestern Syria offensive, Turkish observation posts exchanged artillery fire with Syrian Army units multiple times.

In August 2019, the Turkish Armed Forces constructed an unofficial 13th observation post at Maar Hattat, 10 kilometers south of Ma'arrat al-Nu'man.

In late August 2019, the Turkish observation post at Morek was fully encircled by the Syrian Army after it captured a rebel pocket in the region. The Turkish government announced that it would not move or dismantle the post.

Northwestern Syria offensive (December 2019–March 2020)

In late December 2019, the Turkish observation post near Sarman was encircled by the Syrian Army during the course of its Autumn offensive. Turkey has stated that it would not evacuate the post.

2020

On 29 January 2020, the Syrian Army encircled the Turkish observation post at Rashidin in the western outskirts of Aleppo after pushing back rebel forces from the area.

On 30 January 2020, following the Syrian Army's capture of Ma'arrat al-Nu'man, the Turkish Army set up two more observation posts - just South and North of the town of Saraqib. It then established a third post to the east of the town on 1 February.

On 1 February 2020, the Syrian military encircled the Turkish observation post at Maar Hattat, which was built following the Syrian Army's capture of Khan Shaykhun in the summer of 2019.

On 3 February 2020, Syrian Army shelling killed seven Turkish soldiers and one civilian contractor. Seven soldiers were also wounded. The Turkish Army retaliated by targeting Syrian Army positions with artillery and howitzer fire, resulting in 13 dead.

On 5 February, the Syrian Army captured the village of Tell Touqan and thus encircled the Turkish observation post located there. It was not immediately made clear whether or not the post was placed under siege.

On 6 February, the Turkish Armed Forces established a new outpost at Taftanaz Military Airbase. It was reportedly targeted by the Syrian Air Force just hours after its establishment. The Syrian Army completely encircled the town of Saraqib, which hosts four unofficial TAF military installations.

On 7 February, the Turkish Armed Forces created a new military post east of Idlib City, just west of Saraqib.

On 8 February, the Turkish Armed Forces established yet another military post, this time located in the Al-Mastumah area between Idlib City and Ariha. A day after the Syrian Army began encircling the Turkish observation post at Al-Eiss, it managed to capture both the town and its corresponding hill after the rebel forces that previously controlled it withdrew following a three-pronged envelopment by government forces.

On 10 February, five or six Turkish soldiers were killed and another seven were wounded due to artillery fire from the Syrian Armed Forces.

On 14 February, the Turkish army set up a base at Deir Sunbul village.

On 15 February, the Turkish army established two new military posts near Darat Izza.

On 16 February, the Syrian Army shelled the Turkish military post at Shekh Aqil, reportedly injuring many Turkish soldiers.

On 17 February, the Syrian Observatory for Human Rights reported that the Turkish military had established several more military posts, bringing the total number of official and unofficial Turkish military installations in Idlib up to 35.

On 20 February, 2 Turkish soldiers died and 5 were reported wounded while they were assaulting, along with their proxies, the town of Al-Nayrab.

On 26 February, 2 Turkish troops were killed and several others were reported wounded following a Syrian airstrike in Idlib province. The Syrian Army captured Deir Sunbul, besieging the nearby Turkish observation post stationed nearby in an area called Sheir Maghar.

Operation Spring Shield

On 27 February, at least 33 Turkish soldiers were killed by Syrian or Russian airstrikes. Rebel forces advanced on Saraqeb under the cover of Turkish missile fire, thus managing to recapture the town and lift the siege imposed on three of the four surrounding Turkish observation posts - to the north, west and south of the town. The eastern observation post remained surrounded by government forces.

On 28 February, one Turkish soldier died and six more were wounded in Syrian air and artillery strikes in Idlib.

Between 28 February and 6 March at least 165 Syrian soldiers and militiamen loyal to them were killed by Turkish Armed Forces in retaliation to Balyun airstrikes that killed at least 34 Turkish soldiers.

Ceasefire (March 2020–present)
On 18 March, Turkish troops entered the de-escalation zone to reopen the M4 highway previously blocked by Hayat Tahrir al-Sham and jihadist factions.

On April 26, Turkish forces killed 4 fighters of Hayyaat Tahrir Al-Sham in Idlib.

On 5 May, Syrian forces destroyed a Turkish bulldozer with a missile in Al-Dweir checkpoint north of Saraqeb. A second bulldozer sent to retrieve the first was in turn destroyed by another missile, killing and wounding the drivers.

On 27 May, the Turkish Ministry of Defense announced the death of a Turkish soldier by an explosion in the Aleppo-Latakia Highway in northwestern Idlib. A convoy of Turkish military vehicles and opposition factions was targeted by a IED, Turkish helicopters evacuated the wounded to Al-Rayhaniyyah.

On 9 September, the Turkish Armed forces said that Brigadier General Sezgin Erdoğan died while on duty on Idlib, Syria. According to Turkish officials, Sezgin Erdoğan died in a hospital after falling ill.

On 19 October 2020, Turkey withdrew its military presence from its base at Morek, Hama Governorate.

List of observation posts 
The following is a non-exhaustive list of observation posts and other military installations of the Turkish Armed Forces in Idlib:

Reactions

Within Syria 
 Syrian government: An unnamed source at Syria's Foreign Ministry said, "The Turkish regime must abide by what was agreed in Astana."
 Army of Revolutionaries: Ahmed Sultan, commander of the Army of Revolutionaries, accused Turkey of selling Idlib to the Syrian regime, Iran and Russia and called upon the people of Idlib to resist the planned Turkish, Iranian, and Russian intervention in Idlib.

International reactions 

: The head of the Russian delegation for the Astana talks, Alexander Lavrentyev, said that Russia was ready to act as a mediator between the Syrian government and Turkey regarding the situation in Idlib.

Supranational reactions 
: The UN's special envoy to Syria, Staffan de Mistura, said the creation of a fourth de-escalation zone is a positive development.

See also 
Turkish occupation of northern Syria
Turkish involvement in the Syrian civil war
Inter-rebel conflict during the Syrian Civil War
al-Nusra Front–SRF/Hazzm Movement conflict
Battle of Maarrat al-Nu'man (2016)
October 2016 Idlib Governorate clashes
Idlib Governorate clashes (January–March 2017)
Idlib Governorate clashes (July 2017)

Notes

References 

Conflicts in 2017
Conflicts in 2018
Conflicts in 2019
Conflicts in 2020
Military operations of the Syrian civil war in 2017
Military operations of the Syrian civil war in 2018
Military operations of the Syrian civil war involving Turkey
Idlib Governorate in the Syrian civil war
Military operations of the Syrian civil war in 2019
Military operations of the Syrian civil war in 2020
Cross-border operations of Turkey into Syria